The Great Bear Rainforest  is a temperate rain forest on the Pacific coast of British Columbia, Canada, comprising 6.4 million hectares. It is part of the larger Pacific temperate rainforest ecoregion, which is the largest coastal temperate rainforest in the world.

The Great Bear Rainforest was officially recognized by the Government of British Columbia in February 2016, when it announced an agreement to permanently protect 85% of the old-growth forested area from industrial logging. The forest was admitted to the Queen's Commonwealth Canopy in September of the same year.

Geography

As part of the 2006 North and Central Coast Land Use Decision three new land use zones were created: Protected Areas; Biodiversity, Mining, and Tourism Areas (BMTAs); and Ecosystem-based Management Operating Areas (EBMs). Commercial timber harvesting and commercial hydro-electric power projects are prohibited within BMTAs.

The Great Bear Rainforest extends from the Discovery Islands in the south to the BC-Alaska boundary in the north, it includes all offshore islands within this range except Vancouver Island and the archipelago of Haida Gwaii. Its northern end reaches up Portland Canal to the vicinity of Stewart. To the south it includes Prince Rupert, most of Douglas Channel, half of Hawkesbury Island, and part of Gardner Canal. Kitimat is outside the region, to the east. Farther south, the region includes all of the coast west and south of the Fiordland Conservancy, Kitlope Heritage Conservancy Protected Area, Tweedsmuir North and Tweedsmuir South Provincial Parks—which includes Dean Channel, Burke Channel, Rivers Inlet, and the communities of Bella Bella, Bella Coola, and Hagensborg. The southern end of the region includes Knight Inlet and Bute Inlet.

Ecology

The Great Bear Rainforest is one of the largest remaining tracts of unspoiled temperate rainforest left in the world. The area is home to species such as cougars, wolves, salmon, grizzly bears, and the Kermode ("spirit") bear, a unique subspecies of the black bear, in which one in ten cubs displays a recessive white coloured coat.

The forest features 1,000-year-old western red cedar and 90-metre Sitka spruce.

Coastal temperate rainforests are characterized by their proximity to both ocean and mountains. Abundant rainfall results when the atmospheric flow of moist air off the ocean collides with mountain ranges. Much of the Pacific coastline of North America shares this climate pattern, including portions of Alaska, British Columbia, Washington, Oregon, and Northern California.

History

Campaign for protection
In the early 1990s environmentalists launched a large scale campaign to protect the Clayoquot Sound region of Vancouver Island. After years of conflict the British Columbia government announced a ban on clear-cutting in the Clayoquot rainforests and began a local planning process that incorporated First Nations of the area and independent scientists. The Clayoquot Sound campaign became the model for the Great Bear Rainforest campaign. Techniques used at Clayoquot Sound were further developed and new approaches adopted, such as international marketing campaigns, improved mapping technologies, and the use of large-scale holistic ecosystem-based management models. In 1997 the central and northern BC coastal region was renamed "Great Bear Rainforest" by a network of ENGOs (environmental nongovernmental organizations), including Greenpeace, Sierra Club BC, Pacific Wild, and Stand.earth, for the purpose of galvanizing an international campaign for its protection. The name, which was chosen without consulting local residents, was by 2005 being used by many organizations, including news media outlets. As Maureen Gail Reed writes, "the emotive significance of such a name cannot be underestimated".

This fell short of the scientific recommendations, which had concluded that 44%–70% should be protected. The recommendation given to the BC government was a compromise solution agreed to by the many stakeholders after years of difficult negotiations. The stakeholders include provincial and local governments; many BC First Nations such as the Heiltsuk and Homalco; the ENGOs Greenpeace, ForestEthics, Rainforest Action Network, Pacific Wild, and Sierra Club BC and forestry corporations such as Canadian Forest Products, Catalyst Paper Corporation, International Forest Products, Western Forest Products; and many others.

On 7 February 2006 a comprehensive protection package was announced for the Great Bear Rainforest, which was defined to include the central and north coasts of BC and Haida Gwaii (formerly known as the Queen Charlotte Islands). The Great Bear Rainforest Agreement included four key elements: rainforest protection, improved logging practices, the involvement of First Nations in decision making, and conservation financing to enable economic diversification. The final agreement banned logging in 33% of the Great Bear Rainforest and made a commitment to implement ecosystem-based forestry management for the entire Great Bear Rainforest by 2009.

The 2006 agreement between the BC government and a wide coalition of conservationists, loggers, hunters, and First Nations established a series of conservancies stretching  along the coast. The proposed protected areas will contain , and another  that is to be run under a management plan that is expected to ensure sustainable forest management.

The Canadian government announced on 21 January 2007 that it will spend  for protection of this rainforest. This matches a pledge made previously by the British Columbia provincial government, as well as private donations of $60 million, making the total funding for the new reserve $120 million.

In the autumn of 2008, Greenpeace, Sierra Club BC and ForestEthics (jointly known as Rainforest Solutions Project) launched an online campaign titled, "Keep the Promise," to put public pressure on Gordon Campbell, then Premier of British Columbia, to honour the Great Bear Rainforest agreement in its entirety. The groups were concerned certain aspects of the agreement, including implementation of ecosystem-based management (EBM), would not materialize in time for the government's own final implementation deadline of March 31, 2009.

Government recognition and protection
On February 1, 2016, Premier Christy Clark announced an agreement had been reached between the province of British Columbia, First Nations, environmentalists and the forestry industry to protect 85% of the 6.4 million hectare Great Bear Rainforest from industrial logging. The remaining 15% would still be subject to logging under stringent conditions. The agreement also recognizes aboriginal rights to shared decision-making, and provides a greater economic share of timber rights and $15-million in funding to 26 First Nations in the area.

The Great Bear Rainforest (Forest Management) Act was introduced by the government on March 1, 2016. In September, Prince William, Duke of Cambridge, and Catherine, Duchess of Cambridge, visited and unveiled a plaque in the forest acknowledging its admission into the Queen's Commonwealth Canopy.

Fuel spill
On 13 October 2016, a tugboat hauling an empty tanker barge ran aground on a reef just off the coast of Athlone Island in Seaforth Channel. The reef was located in the traditional territorial waters of the Heiltsuk First Nation and within the larger Great Bear Rainforest. The tug leaked over 100,000 litres of diesel fuel and sank into the channel. By 26 October, the fuel tanks of the tug were emptied and about 101,131 litres of oily water was recovered. The fuel spill was the last major incident to occur in the region since BC Ferries' Queen of the North ran aground and sank off the coast of Gill Island on 21 March 2006.

Public outcry over the incident coupled with increased interest in preserving the ecological integrity of the rainforest helped to spur the passage of the Oil Tanker Moratorium Act on 21 June 2019, which prohibits any oil tanker from docking at any port along the North Coast of British Columbia.

See also
 Forest Products Association of Canada

References

Further reading

External links

 
  Take It Taller: Save The Great Bear Rainforest
 

Pacific temperate rainforests
Old-growth forests
Central Coast of British Columbia
Environmental issues in Canada
Forests of British Columbia